Héctor Gustavo Gatti (born January 25, 1972 in Mar del Plata (Buenos Aires), Argentina) is a former Argentine footballer who played for Clubs of Argentina, Chile, Mexico and Uruguay.

Teams
  Huachipato 1992-1997
  Liverpool 1998
  Morelia 1999
  Rangers 2000
  Provincial Osorno 2001-2002
  Huachipato 2002-2003
  Banfield de Mar del Plata 2004-2005
  Aldosivi 2005-2006
  Deportivo Santamarina 2006-2007
  Alvarado de Mar del Plata 2007-2009
  Talleres de Mar del Plata 2010-2011

References
 

1972 births
Living people
Argentine footballers
Argentine expatriate footballers
Aldosivi footballers
C.D. Huachipato footballers
Provincial Osorno footballers
Rangers de Talca footballers
Atlético Morelia players
Liverpool F.C. (Montevideo) players
Chilean Primera División players
Primera B de Chile players
Liga MX players
Expatriate footballers in Chile
Expatriate footballers in Mexico
Expatriate footballers in Uruguay
Association footballers not categorized by position
Sportspeople from Mar del Plata